Accepted species

Formerly placed here
 Calydorea speciosa (Hook.) Herb. (as S. speciosum Hook.)
 Eleutherine bulbosa (Mill.) Urb. (as S. bulbosum Mill.)
 Libertia ixioides (G.Forst.) Spreng. (as S. ixioides G.Forst.)
 Solenomelus pedunculatus (Gillies) Hochr. (as S. pedunculatum Gillies ex Hook.)
 Olsynium junceum

References

List
Sisyrinchium